SSX is a snowboarding and skiing video game series published by EA Sports.

SSX may also refer to:
 SSX (2000 video game), the first video game in the SSX series
SSX (2012 video game), a reboot of the SSX series
 SSX/VSE, an IBM DOS-derived operating system for mid-range System/370 based architectures
 Sussex, county in England, Chapman code
 Surabaya Stock Exchange
 Synovial sarcoma, X breakpoint

See also
 Arcadia of My Youth: Endless Orbit SSX, a series in the Captain Harlock franchise